Charles Brady may refer to:

 Charles Brady (artist) (1926–1997), American-born painter in Ireland
 Charles E. Brady, Jr. (1951–2006), American physician and NASA astronaut

See also